Rani Sahiba is a Bollywood film. It was released in 1940. An action film, the cast included Prakash, Rajkumari, Urmila, Samson.

References

External links
 

1940 films
1940s Hindi-language films
Indian black-and-white films
Indian action films
1940s action films
Hindi-language action films